Ange Flore Atsé Chiépo is an Ivorian former footballer who played as a forward. She has been a member of the Ivory Coast women's national team.

International career
Atsé capped for Ivory Coast at senior level during the 2008 African Women's Championship qualification (first round).

See also
List of Ivory Coast women's international footballers

References

Living people
Ivorian women's footballers
Women's association football forwards
Ivory Coast women's international footballers
Year of birth missing (living people)